Xiangyang is a prefecture-level city in northwestern Hubei province, China and the second largest city in Hubei by population. It was known as Xiangfan from 1950 to 2010. The Han River runs through Xiangyang's centre and divides the city north–south. The city itself is an agglomeration of two once separate cities: Fancheng and Xiangyang (or Xiangcheng), and was known as Xiangfan before 2010. What remains of old Xiangyang is located south of the Han River and contains one of the oldest still-intact city walls in China, while Fancheng is located to the north of the Han River. Both cities served prominent historical roles in both ancient and pre-modern Chinese history. Today, the city has been a target of government and private investment as the country seeks to urbanize and develop the interior provinces. Its built-up area made up of 3 urban districts had 2,319,640 inhabitants at the 2020 census while the whole municipality contained approximately 5,260,951 people.

History

Xiangyang is located at a strategic site on the middle reaches of the Han River, and has witnessed several significant battles in Chinese history. Xiangyang County was first established at the location of modern Xiangcheng in the early Western Han dynasty and the name had been used continuously for more than 2,000 years until the 20th century.

In the final years of the Eastern Han dynasty, Xiangyang became the capital of Jing Province (ancient Jingzhou). The warlord Liu Biao governed his territory from here. Under Liu's rule, Xiangyang became a major destination of the northern elite fleeing warfare in the Central Plain. In the Battle of Xiangyang in 191 AD, Sun Jian, a rival warlord and the father of Sun Quan, founder of Eastern Wu, was defeated and killed. The area passed to Liu Bei after Liu Biao's death. Two decades later, Battle of Fancheng, one of the most important battles in late Han-Three Kingdoms period, was fought here, resulting in Liu Bei's loss of Jingzhou.

During the early years of Jin dynasty, Xiangyang was on the frontier between Jin and Eastern Wu. Yang Hu, the commander in Xiangyang, was remembered for his policy of "border peace". Cross-border commerce was allowed, and the pressure on the Jin army was greatly relieved. Eventually, Xiangyang accumulated sufficient supplies for 10 years, which played a key role in Jin's conquest of Wu.

In Southern Song dynasty, after the Treaty of Shaoxing, Xiangyang became a garrison city on the northern frontier of Song. During Mongol conquest of the Song dynasty, Xiangyang together with Fancheng formed one of the greatest obstacles against the expansion of Mongol Empire. They were able to resist for six years before finally surrendering in the Siege of Xiangyang.

In 1796, Xiangyang was one of the centers of the White Lotus Rebellion against the Qing dynasty. Here, rebel leader Wang Cong'er successfully organized a rebel army of 50,000 and joined the main rebel forces in Sichuan. The revolt lasted for nearly 10 years and marked a turning point in the history of Qing dynasty.

In 1950, Xiangyang and Fancheng were merged to form Xiangfan City. In later 20th century, it became a major transport hub as Handan, Jiaoliu, and Xiangyu railways intersect in Fancheng. The city's current boundaries were established in 1983 when Xiangyang Prefecture was incorporated into Xiangfan City. The city was renamed to Xiangyang in 2010.

Geography and Climate
It borders Suizhou to the east, Jingmen and Yichang to the south, Shennongjia and Shiyan to the west, and Nanyang (Henan) to the north.

Xiangyang has a monsoon-influenced, four season humid subtropical climate (Köppen Cfa), with cold, damp (but comparatively dry), winters, and hot, humid summers.

Administration

The prefecture-level city of Xiangyang administers 9 county-level divisions, including 3 districts, 3 county-level cities and 3 counties.

 Xiangzhou District
 Xiangcheng District
 Fancheng District
 Zaoyang City
 Yicheng City
 Laohekou City
 Nanzhang County
 Gucheng County
 Baokang County

These are further divided into 159 township-level divisions, including 106 towns, 29 townships and 24 subdistricts.

Economy

Xiangyang possesses large water energy resources whilst its mineral deposits include rutile, ilmenite, phosphorus, barite, coal, iron, aluminum, gold, manganese, nitre, and rock salt. The reserves of rutile and ilmenite rank highly in China. Textile production is the mainstay industry of Xiangyang followed by machinery manufacture, chemical processing, electronics, and manufacture of construction materials. Agricultural resources are significant with Xiangyang's chief farm products including grain, cotton, vegetable oil crops, tobacco, tea and fruit. As the home of Dongfeng Motors, Xiangyang is a well known automobile hub and partners with foreign manufacturers to produce Nissan and Infiniti models for domestic sales. In addition, there are a number of chemical fibre enterprises in the city including Birla Jingwei Fibres, a member of the Aditya Birla Group.  The city has also invested in many industrial, technology and clean energy parks.

Industry development 

Xiangyang has been evaluated as one of “Top-100 Commercial Cities in Chinese Mainland” and “Top-20 Suitable Cities to Set Up Factories in Chinese Mainland” by Forbes. National top-50 city. New energy vehicle, civil-military integration industry, renewable energy utilization – three national new industrial demonstration bases. Comprehensive national industrial innovation center. “Core” industry intelligent creation center. National demonstration base of manufacturing industry high quality development.

Xiangyang has formed a modern multi-industry system of “one leading industry (Auto industry) and six pillars”, and has gathered more than 30 world top-500 enterprise such as Dongfeng, Nissan and Huawei.

Hubei Free Trade Zone at Xiangyang 
With a total planned area of 21.99 square km, Hubei Free Trade Zone at Xiangyang is one of the three Hubei Free Trade Pilot Zones, a national opening-up platform and a new height of leading opening-up, enjoying preferential policies of free trade zone and national high-tech zone and giving priority to high-end equipment manufacturing, new energy autos, big data, cloud computing, business logistics, inspection and testing.

Transportation 
Xiangyang is a railway junction for the Xiangyang-Chongqing (Xiangyu), Hankou-Danjiangkou (Handan), and Jiaozuo-Liuzhou (Jiaoliu) Railways. Xiangyang East railway station opened in 2019 and is connected to multiple high-speed lines. Three National Highways including Route 207 pass through the city. The Han River and four other rivers are open to commercial transport year-round. The Xiangyang Liuji Airport has commercial airline services to major cities throughout China including Beijing, Shanghai, and Guangzhou.

With Xiangyang-Ningbo Port International Sea-railway Combined Transportation, “Xiangyang-Wuhan-Europe” Central Europe Freight Trains, three-dimensional international logistics channels have been established. Economic ties with countries and areas along the “Belt and Road” are getting closer and closer.

See also 
Battle of Xiangyang

References

External links

 Government website of Xiangyang (in Simplified Chinese)
 Xiangzhou District Government Website
 Exploring Chinese History: Geographical Database Entry

 
Cities in Hubei
Prefecture-level divisions of Hubei